Miracanthops is a genus of mantises in the family Acanthopidae. All of the species in the genus are native to Peru and Ecuador.

References  

 Miracanthops at Mantodea Species File

Acanthopidae
Invertebrates of Ecuador
Invertebrates of Peru
Mantodea genera